Porter Lee Fortune Jr. (July 2, 1920 – September 14, 1989) was the Chancellor of the University of Mississippi from 1968 to 1984.

Biography
He was born in 1920. He served as a US naval officer in the Second World War. He received a PhD from the University of North Carolina at Chapel Hill. He taught at Mississippi Southern College, now known as the University of Southern Mississippi, and later served as dean of the university and graduate school. He served as chancellor of the University of Mississippi from 1968 to 1984.

References

1920 births
1989 deaths
People from Mississippi
United States Navy personnel of World War II
University of North Carolina at Chapel Hill alumni
University of Southern Mississippi faculty
Chancellors of the University of Mississippi
United States Navy officers
20th-century American academics